Margaret Bevans Ransone (born April 24, 1973) is an American politician. A Republican, she was elected to the Virginia House of Delegates in 2011. She  the 99th district, made up of the Northern Neck counties of King George, Lancaster, Northumberland, Richmond and Westmoreland, and part of Caroline County.

Early life and education
Ransone was born in Richmond, Virginia and raised in Westmoreland County. She received a B.A. degree from Randolph-Macon College in 2002.

Political career
The 99th district incumbent, Democrat Albert C. Pollard, retired for the second time in 2011. Ransone won a three-way primary for the Republican nomination with 61.25% of the vote. She then defeated Democratic candidate Nicholas C. "Nick" Smith 14330–6364.

In 2022, Ransone was promoted to chair of the Privileges and Elections Committee.

Personal life
She is married to Christopher Todd Ransone. They have two children, Ann and Christopher.

Notes

External links

1973 births
Living people
Republican Party members of the Virginia House of Delegates
Randolph–Macon College alumni
Politicians from Richmond, Virginia
People from Westmoreland County, Virginia
21st-century American politicians
21st-century American women politicians
Women state legislators in Virginia